Fernando Brandán may refer to: 

 Fernando Brandán (footballer, born 1980), Argentine footballer
 Fernando Brandán (footballer, born 1990), Argentine footballer